Oligodon deuvei is a species of snake in the family Colubridae. The species is endemic to Southeast Asia.

Etymology
The specific name, deuvei, is in honor of Jean Deuve (1918–2008) who was a French military officer and amateur naturalist.

Geographic range
O. deuvei is found in Cambodia, southern Vietnam, and Laos; it is expected to occur in northeastern Thailand.

Habitat
The preferred natural habitat of O. deuvei is forest, but it is also found in gardens.

Description
O. deuvei differs from other known species of its group (the O. taeniatus group) by the combination of 12–15 maxillary teeth, 17 dorsal scale rows at midbody, approximately seven supralabials, the absence of dorsal and tail blotches, and the presence of a single vertebral black stripe, which is usually orange or red. O. deuvei is most similar to O. barroni, but differs from the latter by having more maxillary teeth and its absence of dorsal and tail marks.

Behavior
O. deuvei is terrestrial, semiaquatic, crepuscular and diurnal.

Diet
O. deuvei preys predominately upon frogs and tadpoles.

Reproduction
The mode of reproduction of O. deuvei is unknown.

References

Further reading
Geissler, Peter; Nguyen, Truong Quang; Poyarkov, Nikolay A.; Böhme, Wolfgang (2011). "New records of snakes from Cat Tien National Park, Dong Nai and Lam Dong provinces, southern Vietnam". Bonn zoological Bulletin 60 (1): 9–16.
Neang, Thy; Grismer, L. Lee; Daltry, Jennifer C. (2012). "A new species of kukri snake (Colubridae: Oligodon Fitzinger, 1826) from the Phnom Samkos Wildlife Sanctuary, Cardamom Mountains, southwest Cambodia". Zootaxa 3388 : 41–55.
Pauwels, Olivier S.G.; Larsen, Henning; Suthanthangjai, Winai; David, Patrick; Sumontha, Montri (2017). "A new kukri snake (Colubridae: Oligodon) from Hua Hin District, and the first record of O. deuvei from Thailand". Zootaxa 4291 (3): 531–548. 
Vassilieva, Anna B.; Geissler, Peter; Galoyan, Eduard A.; Poyarkov, Nikolay A. Jr.; Van Devender, Robert Wayne; Böhme, Wolfgang (2013). "A new species of Kukri Snake (Oligodon Fitzinger, 1826; Squamata: Colubridae) from the Cat Tien National Park, southern Vietnam". Zootaxa 3702 (3): 233–246.

External links

deuvei
Reptiles described in 2008
Reptiles of Cambodia
Reptiles of Laos
Reptiles of Vietnam
Snakes of Southeast Asia

Snakes of Vietnam
Snakes of Asia